Stokkseyri is a small town in Southern Iceland, with a population of around 445.

Overview
Founded around 900 AD by the settler Hásteinn Atlason, it was an important fishing and trading village in previous times.
The town is founded on the Great Þjórsá lava.

The local school is Barnaskólinn á Eyrarbakka og Stokkseyri.

The artistic experimental duo Jónsi & Alex wrote a song named after the town which appears on their album Riceboy Sleeps.

A famous inhabitant of Stokkseyri was Stokkseyrar-Dísa.

It is home to the football team UMF Stokkseyri.

References

Fishing communities
Populated places in Southern Region (Iceland)
Fishing communities in Iceland